Nathalia Aragonese Molina (born September 9, 1981 in Santiago) is a Chilean television, film, and theater actress and theater director. She is known for her roles in Volver a Amar (2014), La Doña (2011) and Esa No Soy Yo (2015), and starring in the film Cabros de mierda directed by Gonzalo Justiniano.

Biography
She studied theater with Fernando González. She made her television debut in 2004 on the telenovela Hippie on Canal 13 where she made a small appearance, and then in 2005 on the show Gatas y tuercas.

In 2006, she was contracted by Televisión Nacional de Chile to play Maya Fritzenwalden in the Chilean television series Floribella.

She played Rocío Poblete in the 2008 Chilean remake of The Office called La ofis. She also played a role in Casados con hijos, the Chilean remake of Married... with Children.

In 2010 she played Pascuala in Manuel Rodríguez and starred in the television series La Doña.

She was in a music video for De Saloon in 2014.

She made her directorial debut in 2015 with La guerra del agua, a montage about the global crisis of water scarcity.

In 2017, she starred in the movie Cabros de Mierda by director Gonzalo Justiniano.

Personal life
She was a partner to actor Mario Horton, whom she met on the set of Floribella, from 2007 to 2011. They had a child together named Milagros in 2008.

Since 2012 she has been in a relationship with director Rodrigo Susarte.

Filmography

Television
 Tranquilo papá, 2017
 Esa no soy yo, 2015
 Volver a amar, 2014
 Lo que callamos las mujeres, 2013
 Las Vega's, 2013
 Los 80, 2013
 La Doña, 2010
 Manuel Rodríguez, 2010
 La Ofis, 2008
 Casado con hijos, 2008
 Mea Culpa, 2007 / 2009
 Alguien te mira, 2007
 Gatas y tuercas, 2005
 Hippie, 2004

Film
 Cabros de Mierda, 2017
 Talca, París y Londres, 2017
 Prueba de actitud, 2016
 El hombre aficionado, 2016
 03:34: Earthquake in Chile, 2011
 Low Tide, 2010

References

External links
  

1981 births
Living people
21st-century Chilean actresses
Actresses from Santiago